Yaatri is a Bangladeshi pop music band. They have been described as a mello rock band.

History
Yaatri was formed by Topu, and Emran while they were students at North South University in 2004. Topu also pursued a solo career. They played in the 2007 Desh Music Festival.

Yaatri launched their first album in 2006 titled Daak. Their first album was pop music. The Daily Star said Daak had taken "Bangla pop music scene by storm". The music was described having relatable lyrics and simple melodies.

Band members
 Topu - vocals
 Tony - drums
 Bipu - lead guitar
 Mitu - bass
 Emran - keyboard

References

Bangladeshi pop music groups
Musical groups established in 2004